ABC 30 may refer to:

KDNL-TV in St. Louis, Missouri
KFSN-TV in Fresno, California (O&O)
KGBD-LD in Great Bend, Kansas
Re-broadcasts KAKE in Wichita, Kansas